The following roads in the United States are named the Martin Luther King Jr. Freeway:
Martin Luther King Jr. Freeway (Fayetteville) in Fayetteville, North Carolina
Martin Luther King Jr. Freeway (Portsmouth) in Portsmouth, Virginia
Martin Luther King Jr. Freeway (Reno) in Reno, Nevada
Martin Luther King Jr. Freeway (San Diego) in San Diego, California
Martin Luther King Jr. Freeway (Greenville) in Greenville, Texas

See also 
 Martin Luther King, Jr., Boulevard (disambiguation)
 List of streets named after Martin Luther King Jr.